Marianna Yablonskaya (1938–1980) is a Russian/ Soviet writer, playwright, theater actress and theater director. She was an actress at the Mayakovsky Theatre and the Lensoviet Academic Theatre.

Biography
Yablonskaya was born in Leningrad in 1938, daughter of Viktor Yablonsky (Виктор Яблонский), a Moscow Art Theater actor and director. In 1959 she graduated from A. N. Ostrovsky Leningrad Theatrical Institute, L. F. Makarev's course. She was one of the leading actors of Lensovet Theater in Leningrad, 

Her most notable role in theatre is Negina in "Talents and Admirers" by Alexander Ostrovsky, staged by Maria Knebel at the Mayakovsky Theater in Moscow.

Her most famous play, Plush Monkey in a Crib (The Role) was staged at the Gogol Theatre in Moscow.

Personal life
Yablonskaya married a rocket scientist, Arkady Yarovsky. Their daughter, Marianna Yarovskaya, is a filmmaker who works in the United States. Her 2018 short documentary film, Women of the Gulag, was nominated for an Oscar.

Selected works
She wrote 11 plays and two books of short stories, including:

Books
(1984). Focusi/ Tricks. Moscow: Soviet Writer. 30,000 copies. 216 pages.
(1992). Summer is Over/ Leto Konchilos. Short stories, play. Afterword by Sergey Yursky. - Moscow: Olimp/ Soviet Writer. 339 pages.  
(2016). Sdaeshsia?/Surrender? Ripol Classic. Foreword by Sergey Yursky, articles by Marianna Yarovskaya and Yuri Nagibin.

Plays
 Ozhog 
 Plushevaia Obeziana v Detskoi Krovatke 
 Black April

References

External links
Yablonskaya bio 
Sdaeshsia? page

1938 births
1980 deaths
Soviet stage actresses
Soviet dramatists and playwrights
20th-century Russian women writers
20th-century Russian actresses
Women dramatists and playwrights
Soviet short story writers
Russian women short story writers
Writers from Saint Petersburg
Soviet women writers